David Laing (20 February 1925 – 15 July 2017) was a Scottish professional footballer.

Laing played for Hearts for eight years and represented the Scottish League XI while there in 1952. His last game for the club was on 4 September 1954 in a 3–2 home victory against Celtic; He left Hearts a day later. His position in the team was given to Dave Mackay, who became a regular first team pick. Laing missed out as Hearts won their breakthrough trophy of the Tommy Walker era, the Scottish League Cup in 1954.

Laing though was to enjoy success of his own elsewhere, as he joined Clyde. He  helped them win the 1955 Scottish Cup Final in his first season. Laing is generally accepted to have been man of the match in both the first game of the final and its replay.

He later played for Hibernian and Gillingham. He was inducted into the inaugural Clyde FC Hall of Fame in 2011. Laing died in July 2017, aged 92.

References

External links

Clyde FC Hall of Fame profile

1925 births
2017 deaths
Footballers from Fife
Association football wing halves
Scottish footballers
Scottish Football League players
English Football League players
Heart of Midlothian F.C. players
Clyde F.C. players
Hibernian F.C. players
Gillingham F.C. players
Margate F.C. players
Ramsgate F.C. players
Canterbury City F.C. players
Scottish Football League representative players
Place of death missing